Provincial Trunk Highway 6 (PTH 6) is a provincial primary highway located in the Canadian province of Manitoba. It runs from the Perimeter Highway of Winnipeg to the Thompson south city limits. It is also the main highway connecting Winnipeg to northern Manitoba. The speed limit is 100 km/h.  The route is also used to deliver nickel from the Thompson mine to the Royal Canadian Mint in Winnipeg. The section of highway between its southern terminus near Winnipeg and the second junction with PTH 68 near Eriksdale is part of the Northern Woods and Water Route. The portion of the highway between Ponton and Thompson was known as Highway 391 prior to 1986.

There have been talks of extending PTH 6 further north from Thompson to Churchill and the Nunavut border. If plans to make a highway in Nunavut connecting from Churchill, and Arviat, Nunavut to Chesterfield Inlet, Nunavut go through, then the first ever major road connection to Nunavut will be made.

Route description

PTH 6 begins in the Interlake Region on the outskirts of Winnipeg in the Rural Municipality of Rosser at an at-grade intersection with PTH 101, which also marks the beginning of the Northern Woods and Water Route, with the road continuing as Patterson Road. It heads west, concurrent (overlapped) with the Northern Woods and Water Route, to have a short concurrency with PR 236 and cross the Prairie Dog Central Railway, where it curves northwest and begins paralleling the rail line as it goes through a switchback. The highway passes through the hamlet of Grosse Isle, where it has intersections with PR 321 and PR 322 as well as briefly crossing into the Rural Municipality of Rockwood before entering the Rural Municipality of Woodlands.

PTH 6 continues due northwest to have intersections with PTH 67 and PR 227 as it goes through a couple switchbacks along a bypass of Warren. The road previously passed directly through town along what is now Railway Avenue. The Prairie Dog Central Railway ends here and PTH 6 continues to have an intersection with PR 323 before traveling through the hamlet of Woodlands, where it has a junction with PR 518 at the northern end of town. The highway has intersections with PR 411 and PR 248 as it passes within  of the western shores of the Shoal Lakes before traveling through Lake Francis.

PTH 6 now enters the Rural Municipality of St. Laurent and has a junction with Twin Beach Road, which leads to Twin Lakes Beach (Twin Beaches), before traveling through the community of St. Laurent, where it begins paralleling the eastern coastline of Lake Manitoba and has an intersection with PR 415. The highway curves due northward at the community of Oak Point, leaving the lake's coastline and crossing into the Rural Municipality of Coldwell.

PTH 6 travels through a switchback at Clarkleigh, where it has an intersection with PR 229, before traveling through the town of Lundar, where it has an intersection with PR 419. The now enters the Rural Municipality of West Interlake and almost immediately passes through Deerhorn, where it curves due northwest again and to mostly bypass the town of Ericksdale within the next few kilometers, having an intersection with PR 417 and becoming concurrent with PTH 68 here. PTH 6 / PTH 68 begin traveling through more wooded areas (prior to this point, PTH 6 had been traveling through mostly agricultural areas), with PTH 68, along with the Northern Woods and Water Route, splitting off and heading west toward the Lake Manitoba Narrows after several kilometers, with PTH 6 continuing northwest to temporarily cross into the Rural Municipality of Grahamdale, traveling through the communities of Mulvihill and Camper before re-entering the Rural Municipality of West Interlake. PTH 6 travels through (though mostly bypasses) the town of Ashern, where it has a short concurrency with PR 325, and the town of Moosehorn, where it has a short concurrency with PR 237 (provides access to Watchorn Provincial Park). PTH 6 originally passed through Ashern along Railway Avenue. The highway goes through a large switchback as it bypasses the hamlet of Grahamdale, having an intersection with PR 239 (provides access to Steep Rock) at Steep Rock Junction shortly thereafter. It travels through the community of Hilbre as it comes within  of the southern shores of Lake St. Martin.

PTH 6 temporarily leaves the Rural Municipality of Grahamdale, traveling through the Pinaymootang First Nation and crossing the Fairford River at the Fairford River Water Control Structure (FRWCS / a dam), just a little  from its mouth on the northeast shore of Lake Manitoba. The highway re-enters the Rural Municipality of Grahamdale and leaves the proximity of Lake Manitoba for good, traveling past Lake Pineimuta and through the community of St. Martin Junction, where and it has an intersection with PR 513, before having junctions with PR 328 and Road 190 North (provides a second access road to Gypsumville).

PTH 6 leaves the Rural Municipality of Grahamdale and the Interlake Region behind to enter the Nor-Man Region and enter Division No. 21 as it travels through more remote areas for the next several kilometers, winding its way northward near the western shores of Lake Winnipeg to have a junction with PTH 60 (provides access to Lake Winnipegosis and Easterville). The highway enters the Misipawistik Cree Nation and has an intersection with Mannix Road (provides access to Grand Rapids Provincial Park) before traveling through the center of the community, crossing the Saskatchewan River via the Grand Rapids Bridge at its mouth on Lake Winnipeg into the town of Grand Rapids (and leaving the First Nation), coming within  of the Grand Rapids Dam (which impounds the Saskatchewan River to form Cedar Lake). PTH 6 crosses the northern part of town, having intersections with Grand Rapids Drive / Campbell Avenue (the town's Main Street) and Government Road (provides access to the dam and Hybord) before leaving Grand Rapids and the vicinity of Lake Winnipeg to cross into Division No. 22 after several kilometers remote terrain in the Boreal Forest of Canada.

The highway crosses the Hudson Bay Railway and has an intersection with PTH 39 at Ponton, where it makes a right at a stop sign and heads northeast alongside the railway for the next several kilometers. The road leaves Setting Lake and the railroad behind as it enters the Mystery Lake Local Government District and crosses the Grass River at Sasagiu Rapids Provincial Park. PTH 6 has an intersection with a short access road to Pisew Falls Provincial Park and the Rotary Suspension Bridge (Pisew Falls Road) before crossing Soab Creek. It has an intersection with PR 375, which provides access to Paint Lake Provincial Park and Paint Lake itslelf, as it winds its way northeast along the woodlands of the Canadian Boreal Forest, passing by several other lakes, such as Upper Ospwagan Lake and Ospwagan Lake. PTH 6 leaves the Mystery Lake Local Government District as it enters the Thompson, with the road widening to a four-lane divided highway and gaining the street name Mystery Lake Road, with the designation transitioning to PR 391 at the signalized intersection with Burntwood Road shortly thereafter.

With the exclusion of the short section of four-lane in Thompson, the entire length of Manitoba Provincial Trunk Highway 6 is a rural, two-lane highway.

History

In 1928, PTH 6 was originally designated to travel from Minnedosa to the Saskatchewan border southwest of Benito via Dauphin and Swan River. In 1938–1939, the section east of Swan River became part of PTH 10. The remainder was redesignated as PTH 31 and PTH 49 in 1947, with PTH 6 being designated to its current route at that time.

When it was designated to its current route, PTH 6 travelled from Winnipeg as far as Gypsumville. The highway was extended from Gypsumville to Grand Rapids in 1964, followed by a further expansion to PR 391 at Ponton in 1972.

The last section of PTH 6 from Ponton to Thompson was designated in 1987, when the section of PR 391 between Thompson and PTH 10 was decommissioned. The section of the former PR 391 between Ponton and PTH 10 was redesignated as PTH 39.

Major intersections

References

External links 
Official Name and Location - Declaration of Provincial Trunk Highways Regulation - The Highways and Transportation Act - Provincial Government of Manitoba
Official Highway Map - Published and maintained by the Department of Infrastructure - Provincial Government of Manitoba (see Legend and Map#2, 4, 5, 6 & 7)
Google Maps Search - Provincial Trunk Highway 6

006
Northern Woods and Water Route